Pekhtikha is a rural locality (a village) in Kharovskoye Rural Settlement, Kharovsky District, Vologda Oblast, Russia. The population was 5 as of 2002.

Geography 
Pekhtikha is located 10 km northeast of Kharovsk (the district's administrative centre) by road. Churilovo is the nearest rural locality.

References 

Rural localities in Kharovsky District